The Three Creeks Trail is a  pedestrian and bicycle trail that runs through the Willow Glen neighborhood in San Jose, California, from Los Gatos Creek by Lonus Street to the Guadalupe River, as the western alignment. The western section of the trail has been paved since late 2018. An eastern alignment is planned, but not funded, to extend the trail to the Coyote Creek Trail.

History
The trail was previously a Western Pacific railway line as part of the Willow Glen industrial lead of the San Jose Branch line. A trestle bridge, the Willow Glen Trestle, was built in 1921 and crossed the Los Gatos Creek near Lonus Street. A train used to travel to and from the Del Monte cannery. In the early 1980s the Union Pacific purchased the Western Pacific, the Union Pacific abandoned the line in the early 2000s 

There a three large remains of the line, a trestle built in 1921 (demolished), a girder bridge over the Guadalupe River, and a stretch of the line from the former Williams Street yard at the intersection of 23rd Street and William Street to the BART right of way with the Bayshore Highway overhead bridge

As of 2013 the trail was under development. Most of the western alignment was usable although mainly as dirt track.

In June 2017 construction began on the section between Coe Avenue and Minnesota Avenue. It re-opened as a paved trail in August 2018.

The route

The trail crosses or accesses the following roads.
 Lonus Street
 Coe Avenue
 Leona Court, as access
 Broadway Avenue
 Willow Street, near the Bird Avenue intersection
 Bird Avenue
 Dorothy Avenue, as access
 Delmas Avenue and Milton Way, as access
 Minnesota Avenue
 Falcon Place passing Kyva Park

References

Rail trails in California
Bike paths in San Jose, California
Tourist attractions in San Jose, California